Delphinium brunonianum, common name musk larkspur,  is a species of larkspur belonging to the family Ranunculaceae.

Description
It has a strong musky smell (hence the common name). The leaves are palmately lobed, petiolate and alternate. This plant produces racemes with 5 - 10 blue to purple cup-shaped flowers. Tepals have slender white hairs on both sides and  spurs are short. They bloom from July to September.

Distribution
This species is native to Central Asia, Afghanistan, Pakistan, Tibet and the Himalaya.

Habitat

References

Hortipedia
Plants for a future
Flowers of India

brunonianum